Events from the year 1605 in France

Incumbents
 Monarch – Henry IV

Events

Births
28 September – Ismaël Bullialdus, astronomer and mathematician (died 1694)

Full date missing
Pierre Patel, painter (died 1676)
Jean de Montpezat de Carbon, bishop (died 1685)

Deaths
 
4 August – Charles I, Duke of Elbeuf, nobleman (born 1556)
23 September – Pontus de Tyard, poet (born c.1521)
13 October – Theodore Beza, Protestant reformer (born 1519)
3 December – Guy XX de Laval, nobleman (born 1585)

See also

References

1600s in France